Charles E. F. Millard is the former Director of the United States Pension Benefit Guaranty Corporation.  Currently a senior advisor for Amundi Pioneer, Millard is also a consultant/advisor for multiple companies through Cardinal Advisors LLC, and serves on the Board of Directors of Ross Corporate Services, a UK-based pension services firm. Previously Millard was Managing Director in charge of Pension Relations with Citigroup. He has also been an advisor for McKinsey, AQR Capital, and the Kiski Group.

In his role at Citigroup, Millard led international pension conferences and has been a leading speaker at numerous pension-related conferences.  He has appeared on CNBC and has been published in The Wall Street Journal, Bloomberg, Financial Times, and elsewhere on a variety of pension topics.  In March 2016, Millard led the publication of the report "The Coming Pensions Crisis." The report was noteworthy for highlighting $78 trillion in unfunded retirement obligations in twenty countries of the Organisation for Economic Co-operation and Development (OECD).

The report on "The Coming Pensions Crisis" also advocated the development of more pooled defined contribution systems such as Collective Defined Contribution, Target Benefit, and Defined Ambition as methods to increase retirement security.

During his time with Citigroup, he also taught at the Yale School of Management on pensions and public policy.

Millard was the first Director of the PBGC to be Presidentially appointed and confirmed by the United States Senate and ran the agency from 2007 to 2009. As Director, Millard was the chief executive officer of the PBGC and carried the rank of Under Secretary.  Millard served as the President and chief executive officer of the New York City Economic Development Corporation from 1995 to 1999 and was responsible for much of the redevelopment of 42nd St and Times Square.  He was previously a member of the New York City Council, representing the Upper East Side of Manhattan.

Tenure at the PBGC

During his tenure at PBGC, the agency's deficit shrank from $18.9 billion to $11.2 billion in 2008.

The PBGC is governed by a three-person Board; the Secretaries of Treasury, Commerce, and Labor. In February 2008, the Board adopted a new investment policy presented to it by Millard.  The investment policy intended to put 45 percent of the Corporation's $55 billion in equities, 45 percent in fixed income assets, and 10 percent in alternative investments. No assets were transitioned into equities during fiscal year 2008 and the PBGC only began the transition of some assets from fixed-income to equities in late 2008. The New York Times noted in May 2009, that the PBGC had not fully implemented this transition.

Peter R. Orszag (then director of the Congressional Budget Office) stated the following about Millard's plan:

"The change in investment strategy represents an effort on the part of PBGC to increase the expected returns on its assets and to diminish the likelihood that taxpayers will be called on to cover some of its liabilities. The new strategy is likely to produce higher returns, on average, over the long run. But the new strategy also increases the risk that PBGC will not have sufficient assets to cover retirees’ benefit payments when the economy and financial markets are weak. By investing a greater share of its assets in risky securities, PBGC is more likely to experience a decline in the value of its portfolio during an economic downturn—the point at which it is most likely to have to assume responsibility for a larger number of underfunded pension plans."

Some proposed that the new policy was still relatively conservative when compared to private pension funds, according to "Pensions and Investments", a trade publication. Ron Gebhardtsbauer, former PBGC actuary and head of the Actuarial Science Program at Penn State's Smeal College of Business, stated on June 16th, 2010, "If the PBGC had followed Millard and invested in stocks in 2009, it could have $10 billion more in assets today."

In May 2009, The New York Times reported that Millard was criticized by PBGC's Inspector General for certain ethical matters related to Millard's relationships with companies and executives involved with the award of a PBGC contract.  Millard relied on his Fifth Amendment right not to testify before a Senate investigative committee.  March 2010, the Inspector General advised Senators Grassley, Baucus, Enzi and Harkin that the investigation was completed and no charges would be filed.

Earlier career

Millard was previously a Managing Director with Lehman Brothers and was a cabinet official in the administration of New York City Mayor Rudolph Giuliani.

Public Sector

Under Mayor Giuliani, Millard served as President of the New York City Economic Development Corporation and Chairman of the New York City Industrial Development Agency.

Millard was twice elected to the New York City Council, and was the first Republican elected Councilman from Manhattan in twenty-five years.  In that role he drafted the original legislation to eliminate pornography stores from many New York neighborhoods.

Millard also ran for Congress in 1994 against Representative Carolyn Maloney.  He lost 64% to 35%. His 35% of the vote is ten points higher than that of any Republican candidate in that district since then.

Private Sector
In the private sector, Millard served as a Managing Director at both Lehman Brothers and Prudential Securities, and immediately prior to joining the PBGC, Millard was a Managing Director at Broadway Partners, a national real estate investment and management firm in New York. Millard also served as an attorney with Davis Polk & Wardwell where his activities included constitutional litigation in the United States Court of Appeals for the Second Circuit.

Millard was also an op-ed columnist for the New York Post.

In 1979–80, he worked as a VISTA volunteer in Crown Heights, Brooklyn, and in 1982–83, he served as Legislative Assistant for Foreign Affairs for Congresswoman Millicent Fenwick.

Education

According to his 2007 profile at the PBGC website, "Mr. Millard holds a B.A. Honors Degree, cum laude and Phi Beta Kappa from the College of the Holy Cross and a J.D. from Columbia Law School, where each year he was ranked a Harlan Fiske Stone Scholar."

Personal

Millard and his wife are parents of nine children.

References

New York (state) Republicans
New York City Council members
College of the Holy Cross alumni
Columbia Law School alumni
Pension Benefit Guaranty Corporation
Year of birth missing (living people)
Living people
Davis Polk & Wardwell lawyers
American chief executives